The Glenville Pathfinder is a newspaper serving Glenville, West Virginia, and surrounding Gilmer County. Published weekly, it has a circulation of 1,194 and is owned by Glenville-Corcoran Newspapers.

It was founded in 1892 as a weekly by Wat Warren, as a Republican weekly. By 1920, it had a circulation of 700 and was published by Hunter W. Brannon.

In 1971, it was bought (along with sister publication the Democrat) by two New York executives—one a banker and one an editor of a sporting magazine—looking to escape city life and settle in small-town West Virginia. Robert Arnold, the banker, was a former resident of the area returning home. Stanley Meseroll, who at the time was the managing editor of the New York-based Sports Afield, was drawn to the area's opportunities for hunting and fishing. The pair were able within a few short years to increase subscriptions from 2,000 to 3,400, and increase staff to five and a half employees, partially due to a streamlined billing and subscription process. The resulting publicity surrounding the move was enough of a point of pride to West Virginians that Senator Robert Byrd had press regarding the move read into the Senate Record.

Related Resources
 List of newspapers in West Virginia

References

Newspapers published in West Virginia